North Carolina's 16th Senate district is one of 50 districts in the North Carolina Senate. It has been represented by Democrat Gale Adcock since 2023.

Geography
Since 2003, the district has included part of Wake County. The district overlaps with the 11th, 21st, 36th, and 49th state house districts.

District officeholders

Multi-member district

Single-member district

Election results

2022

2020

2018

2016

2014

2012

2010

2008

2006

2004

2002

2000

References

North Carolina Senate districts
Wake County, North Carolina